Göylər Çöl (also, Geoglyar, Geoglyar, Kishlak, Geoglyar-Chol’, and Gëylyar Chël’) is a village in the Shamakhi Rayon of Azerbaijan.  The village forms part of the municipality of Göylər.

References 

Populated places in Shamakhi District